Senator Mason may refer to:

Members of the United States Senate
Armistead Thomson Mason (1787–1819), U.S. Senator from Virginia from 1816 to 1817
James Murray Mason (1798–1871), U.S. Senator from Virginia from 1847 to 1861
Jonathan Mason (Massachusetts politician) (1756–1831), U.S. Senator from Massachusetts from 1800 to 1803
Jeremiah Mason (1768–1848), U.S. Senator from New Hampshire from 1813 to 1817
Stevens Thomson Mason (senator) (1760–1803), U.S. Senator from Virginia from 1794 to 1803
William E. Mason (American politician) (1850–1921), U.S. Senator from Illinois from 1897 to 1903

United States state senate members
Edwyn E. Mason (1913–2003), New York State Senate
Garrett Mason (born 1985), Maine State Senate
James W. Mason (1841–1875), Arkansas State Senate
John Y. Mason (1799–1859), Virginia State Senate
Lance Mason (born 1967), Ohio State Senate
Noah M. Mason (1882–1965), Illinois State Senate
Samson Mason (1793–1869), Ohio State Senate